Ctenobelbidae is a family of mites belonging to the order Sarcoptiformes.

Genera:
 Ctenobelba Balogh, 1943

References

Sarcoptiformes